Andreas Spann (born 17 May 1984) is a German football player who plays as a forward for FV Illertissen. Born in Ulm, he spent three seasons in the Bundesliga with Borussia Mönchengladbach. In April 2000, he went on trial with English club Manchester United.

References

External links
 

1984 births
Living people
German footballers
Borussia Mönchengladbach players
Borussia Mönchengladbach II players
SSV Ulm 1846 players
1. FC Heidenheim players
VfL Osnabrück players
Bundesliga players
3. Liga players
FV Illertissen players
Association football forwards
Sportspeople from Ulm
Footballers from Baden-Württemberg